DZJV (1458 AM) is a radio station owned and operated by ZOE Broadcasting Network. Its studio and tower site are located at #140 Brgy. Parian, Calamba, Laguna, near Riverview Resort.

From April 2014 to March 2015, 8TriMedia Broadcasting occupied the 6PM to 10PM timeslot.

References

Christian radio stations in the Philippines
ZOE Broadcasting Network
DZJV
Radio stations established in 1995